Eudonia tyrophanta is a moth in the family Crambidae. It was described by Edward Meyrick in 1932. It is found in Uganda.

References

Moths described in 1932
Eudonia